The 2019 Toppserien was the 33rd season of the highest women's football league in Norway. LSK Kvinner entered the season as the defending champions.

Teams

League table

Position by round

Relegation play-offs
The relegation play-offs will this season be contested by the 10th placed team in Toppserien, Lyn, and the winner of the 1. divisjon, IF Fløya.

Lyn won 7–1 on aggregate.

Results

Season statistics

Top scorers

Discipline

Player
Most yellow cards: 5
  Sherida Spitse (Vålerenga)
Most red cards: 1
 Aivi Luik (Avaldsnes)
 Rikke Nygard (Arna-Bjørnar)
 Maria Sørenes (Avaldsnes)
 My Haugland Sørsdahl (Kolbotn)
 Justine Vanhaevermaet (Røa)
 Ina Lundereng Vårhus (Trondheims-Ørn)
 Maruschka Waldus (Vålerenga)

Club
Most yellow cards: 26
Røa
Most red cards: 2
Avaldsnes

References

External links
 Official website
 Fixtures and results
 Season on soccerway.com

Toppserien seasons
Top level Norwegian women's football league seasons
1
Norway
Norway